David John Blackbourn PhD FRSB is currently Professor of Virology and Director of the Institute of Medical Sciences at the University of Aberdeen. His research interests emphasise virus understanding how viruses have evolved to manipulate immune responses. Having previously been Head of the School of Biosciences and Medicine for 8 years. He is also a co-founder of Ducentis BioTherapeutics to produce a novel anti-inflammatory therapeutic drug and until September 2022, was non-executive board member. Blackbourn is an Editor-in-Chief of FEMS Microbiology Reviews.

Career 

Under Ronald Chuang, PhD, he became a Post-doctoral Researcher at University of California, Davis in 1990 working on immune responses to Simian Immunodeficiency Virus (SIV). In 1993, after Davis, he moved to University of California, San Francisco, again as a Post-doctoral Researcher, this time in the lab of Jay A. Levy, M.D. where he worked on Human Immunodeficiency Virus (HIV) and Kaposi’s Sarcoma Herpesvirus (KSHV). This position led to becoming a Staff Scientist in 1997. Upon returning to the UK in 1999, he joined the University of Glasgow as lecturer in Virology. After 4 years, in 2003, he was promoted to Senior Lecturer in Virology, followed by Reader in Virology in 2005. Having left Glasgow for Birmingham, he became Reader in Tumour Virology. In 2010 he was made Professor of Virology and in 2013 Honorary Senior Research Fellow.

As Professor of Virology he joined University of Surrey, as Head of the Department of Microbial and Cellular Sciences. He was quickly promoted to Head of the School of Biosciences and Medicine and spent 8 years in the role (2013-2021).

After his time at Surrey, in 2022 he moved to the University of Aberdeen as Professor of Virology and Director of the Institute of Medical Sciences.

In 2014, Ducentis BioTherapeutics was founded based on research Blackbourn had done early in his independent career. In September 2022, Ducentis BioTherapeutics was acquired by Arcutis Therapeutics in a deal worth up to US$400 million.

References

External links

British virologists
Academics of the University of Aberdeen
Academics of the University of Surrey
Year of birth missing (living people)
Living people